Apolygus is a genus of true bugs belonging to the family Miridae.

The genus was first described by China in 1941.

The species of this genus are found in Eurasia.

Species:
Apolygus limbatus
Apolygus lucorum
Apolygus rhamnicola
Apolygus spinolae

References

Miridae genera
Mirini